Harvey James Vale (born 11 September 2003) is an English footballer who plays as a midfielder for  club Chelsea.

Early life
Born in Haywards Heath, West Sussex, Vale started his career at local side Crowborough FC, before joining West London side Fulham. Initially a left-back, Vale played a number of positions at youth level, including covering for an injured goalkeeper for Fulham, before settling as a midfielder.

Career

Chelsea
Vale left Fulham to join West London rivals Chelsea at under-13 level, and signed his first professional contract in September 2020.

On 26 October, he was named among the substitutes for an EFL Cup tie with Southampton.

Vale made his Chelsea debut on 22 December 2021 in the quarter-final of the EFL Cup, starting in a 2–0 win against Brentford. On March 19 2022, he featured in an FA Cup quarter-final match against Middlesbrough, coming on as a substitute for Romelu Lukaku in the 84th minute as Chelsea went on to win the game 2–0.

On 22 May 2022, he was awarded the academy player of the year.

Loan to Hull City
On 1 September 2022, he moved on loan to Hull City for the season after signing a three-year contract with Chelsea. On 17 September 2022, Vale started in the 3–0 loss away to Swansea City. The loan spell was cut short when he returned to Chelsea on 23 January 2023.

International career
Vale has represented England at under-15, under-16, under-17 and under-19 level.

On 17 June 2022, Vale was included in the England U19 squad for the 2022 UEFA European Under-19 Championship. On 1 July 2022, Vale captained the England U19 side and provided an assist for Carney Chukwuemeka to score in a 3–1 victory against Israel in the final. His performances during the competition led to his inclusion in the UEFA team of the tournament.

Career statistics

Club

Honours
England U19
 UEFA European Under-19 Championship: 2022

Individual
 Chelsea Academy Player of the Year: 2021–22
 UEFA European Under-19 Championship Team of the Tournament: 2022

References

2003 births
Living people
People from Haywards Heath
English footballers
England youth international footballers
Association football midfielders
Fulham F.C. players
Chelsea F.C. players
Hull City A.F.C. players